The Last Olympian is a fantasy-adventure novel based on Greek mythology by Rick Riordan, published on May 5, 2009. It is the fifth and final novel of the Percy Jackson & the Olympians series and serves as the direct sequel to The Battle of the Labyrinth. The Last Olympian revolves around the demigod Percy Jackson as he leads his friends in a last stand to protect Mount Olympus.

Upon release, the book received highly positive reviews from various critics. It was also the #1 USA Today bestseller, the #1 Wall Street Journal bestseller, and #1 Los Angeles Times bestseller.

Plot
While Percy Jackson is on a drive with Rachel Dare, he is approached by Charles Beckendorf, and the two head off to attack Luke's ship, The Princess Andromeda. Kronos, hosted in the mortal body of Luke, is not caught off guard because of a spy at Camp Half-Blood, and Beckendorf is killed in an explosion. Percy awakens later in his father Poseidon's underwater palace, which is under siege by the Titan Oceanus. Percy wants to help fight, but Poseidon sends Percy back to Camp Half-Blood to hear the "Great Prophecy". Once there, Percy informs the camp of the spy and learns that the Olympians are fighting Typhon. The following night, Percy leaves with Nico di Angelo, son of Hades, following a lead on how to defeat Kronos. After visiting Luke's mother in Westport, Connecticut, and talking with Hestia, Percy procures a blessing from his mother. He then descends into the Underworld to bathe in the River Styx and take on the curse of Achilles. Despite being betrayed by Nico in exchange for information on the boy's mother, Percy is successful and uses his new invulnerability to defeat a small army of Hades's minions.

Percy emerges from the Underworld in New York City, leaving Nico behind to convince his father to join the fight against Kronos. Percy calls the campers to help defend Olympus, as the gods refuse to end their struggle with Typhon. Just before the battle begins, New York City is affected by a powerful sleeping spell from Morpheus, Hecate, and Kronos himself. Despite being joined by Thalia's Hunters of Artemis, the Party Ponies, and a few other allies, the Olympian army struggles to hold back repeated assaults by the Titan army. Camp Half-Blood suffers 16 losses, out of an original 40 campers. Annabeth herself is badly injured when she saves Percy from an attack by Ethan Nakamura that would have hit Percy in his Achilles' point. Even after these setbacks, Percy refuses a chance to surrender offered by Prometheus, and entrusts the Titan's gift of Pandora's pithos to Hestia. The campers successfully defeat Hyperion, further enraging Kronos. Rachel Dare, who has been experiencing inexplicable moments of prophecy, arrives to warn Percy of a drakon that can only be killed by a child of Ares. The campers do poorly against the drakon until Silena Beauregard arrives disguised as Ares's head counselor Clarisse and breaks the cabin's boycott of the war, getting badly injured in the process. The real Clarisse arrives in a fury and kills the drakon by herself. As Silena lies dying, the campers learn that she was the camp's spy, but chose to right her wrongs after her boyfriend Beckendorf's death.

Percy contacts his father and asks Poseidon to join the fight against Typhon; he reluctantly agrees. Driven back to the blocks surrounding the Empire State Building, Percy and his friends make their last stand to protect Mount Olympus. Even when Hades arrives with Nico and an army, Kronos still manages to enter Olympus. Percy attacks Kronos, without either side gaining a significant advantage. In an Iris message-vision, the combatants are able to see Typhon approaching New York, only to be defeated with the aid of Poseidon and his cyclopes. Ethan Nakamura rebels against Kronos but is killed. When Kronos attacks Annabeth, Luke is able to regain control of his body and, with Percy's help, he injures himself at his mortal point and apparently kills Kronos. As he dies, Luke tells Percy that Ethan had the right idea; the war was caused by the resentment of unrecognized gods and unclaimed children. He dies peacefully, and the Fates carry his body away.

The gods grant rewards to several heroes who were instrumental in defeating the Titans, including Thalia, Grover, Annabeth, Tyson, Clarisse, and Nico. Finally, Percy is called forward. Zeus offers him the greatest gift of all time: immortal godhood. Much to the Olympians' shock, Percy instead asks the gods to swear on the River Styx that they will claim all demigods by the time they turn thirteen, have cabins built for the children of all minor gods and Hades, and give amnesty to innocent Titans and their former allies such as Calypso. Percy also relieves Zeus, Poseidon, and Hades of their oath to not have demigod children. Privately, Hermes reveals to Percy that Kronos is not dead, but is instead hopefully spread so thin that he can never form a consciousness again, let alone a body, as the Titans cannot die any more than the gods can. After the meeting, Percy discovers that Rachel plans to become the new Oracle, and he rushes to camp with Annabeth and Nico. With Apollo's supervision, Rachel safely becomes the new Oracle and speaks the next Great Prophecy. Annabeth celebrates Percy's birthday and the two begin dating. The gods keep to their new promises, and Camp Half-Blood slowly returns to normal. The fallen demigods are honored with the end-of-summer's bead.

Reception
The New York Times called the novel "both exciting and entertaining."  While the review notes that the pace sometimes bordered on "frantic," distracting from weaker plot points, the book as a whole remains "clever" and "enjoyably hair-raising."  The non-profit Common Sense Media warned parents that this final book in the series contains more violence than the previous entries, but praised the book overall, giving it five out of five stars.<ref name="The Last Olympian: Percy Jackson and the Olympians, Book 5" Kirkus Reviews reviewed the book positively, observing that "Riordan masterfully orchestrates the huge cast of characters and manages a coherent, powerful tale at once exciting, philosophical and tear-jerking."

Main characters

 Percy Jackson – The protagonist and narrator of Percy Jackson & the Olympians. He is aged fifteen in The Last Olympian, the son of Poseidon. Like Luke and Achilles he bathes in the River Styx and becomes invincible. He begins a romantic relationship with Annabeth Chase on his sixteenth birthday near the end of the book and even scores an underwater kiss.
 Luke Castellan – A 23-year-old demigod son of Hermes who willingly gave his body to Kronos out of hatred for the Olympian gods. Although he is an antagonist throughout the series, he sacrifices himself in order to destroy Kronos at the end of the book and is, in a way, the actual hero of the Great Prophecy.
 Kronos – The former king of the Titans, bent on restoring his rule and taking revenge on the gods who deposed him. After Luke sacrifices himself to defeat Kronos, Hermes states that although Titans cannot die, any more than the gods can, Kronos' essence is hopefully spread so thin that he can never form a consciousness again let alone a body.
 Annabeth Chase – Daughter of Athena, Percy's love interest and eventual girlfriend, and an aspiring architect.
 Ethan Nakamura – An ally of Kronos and son of Nemesis, without whom Kronos's rise to power would not have been possible. Like Luke, he too feels betrayed by the Greek gods for their refusal to acknowledge his mother as a goddess equal in importance to the twelve Olympians.
 Grover Underwood – Percy's best friend, a satyr, and a new member of the Council of Cloven Elders. He is also a kind of ambassador for the power of the god Pan in the world.
 Thalia Grace – A daughter of Zeus, Percy's close friend, and leader of a group of Artemis's followers, previously believed to be the demigod of the Great Prophecy. She is immortal but physically aged to fifteen, nearly sixteen.
 Nico di Angelo – A son of Hades who is instrumental in convincing his father, Demeter, and Persephone to fight against the Titans. He betrays Percy at first, but is eventually forgiven by him.
 Charles Beckendorf and Silena Beauregard – A couple who both give their lives in defense of Olympus; Beckendorf's death at Luke's hands convinces Silena to renounce her role as Kronos's spy. They are the son of Hephaestus and the daughter of Aphrodite, respectively.
 Clarisse La Rue – A daughter of Ares, and a rival of Percy's. At first, due to a disagreement with Apollo's cabin at Camp Half-Blood, she and her brethren refuse to fight in the war. Her friend Silena Beauregard's death, in part because of her refusal to fight, changes her mind.
Connor and Travis Stoll – The sons of Hermes and friends of Percy. Everyone thinks that they are twins but they are not. Many people assume that they are brothers because they are identical. They like to steal things from camp and love pranks.

Sequel

Another Camp Half-Blood Chronicles series has been released, titled The Heroes of Olympus. The Lost Hero is the first book in this series by Riordan, and was released on October 12, 2010. Though it is not directly related to Percy and friends, there are many references and appearances of these characters and it still serves as a sequel. Its sequel, The Son of Neptune, portrays Percy as one of the main protagonists. The Son of Neptune is followed by The Mark of Athena, The House of Hades, and The Blood of Olympus.

A sixth book in the Percy Jackson & the Olympians series, titled The Chalice of the Gods and set between the events of The Heroes of Olympus and its sequel series The Trials of Apollo, was announced in October 2022, with a release date of September 26, 2023.

References

External links

 Rick Riordan Myth Master at publisher Penguin Books (UK)
 Percy Jackson & the Olympians at publisher Disney-Hyperion Books (US)
 

2009 American novels
Percy Jackson & the Olympians
2009 fantasy novels
Sequel novels
Novels set in Long Island
Novels set in New York City
2009 children's books
Fiction about suicide
Novels by Rick Riordan